Jay Pande (20 September 1994) is an Indian cricketer who plays for Puducherry. He made his List A debut for Maharashtra against Goa in the 2018-19 Vijay Hazare Trophy on 19 September 2018. He made his first-class debut for Maharashtra in the 2018–19 Ranji Trophy on 28 November 2018.

In October and November 2021, he played for Chilaw Marians Cricket Club in the 2021–22 Major Clubs Limited Over Tournament in Sri Lanka.

References

External links

1994 births
Cricketers from Pune
Indian cricketers
Living people
Chilaw Marians Cricket Club cricketers
Maharashtra cricketers
Pondicherry cricketers